Carron Mountain is a mountain 440m high on the border of County Limerick and County Cork, Ireland. It is part of the Ballyhoura Mountains.

Carron is home to the North Cork transmitter for the UPC MMDS service.

References

External links 
 Listing at mountainviews.ie

Mountains and hills of County Limerick
Mountains and hills of County Cork